Somanniathelphusa is a genus of freshwater crabs found in southeast China, Taiwan, and southeast Asia. It includes the following species:

Somanniathelphusa amoyensis Naiyanetr & Dai, 1997
Somanniathelphusa araeochela Naiyanetr & Dai, 1997
Somanniathelphusa bawangensis Dai & Xing, 1994
Somanniathelphusa boyangensis Dai, Peng & Zhou, 1994
Somanniathelphusa brevipodum Tai, Song, He, Cao, Xu & Zhong, 1975
Somanniathelphusa dangi Yeo & Nguyen, 1999: Vietnam
Somanniathelphusa falx Ng & Dudgeon, 1992
Somanniathelphusa gaoyunensis Dai, Peng & Zhou, 1994
Somanniathelphusa grayi (Alcock, 1909)
Somanniathelphusa guillinensis Naiyanetr & Dai, 1997
Somanniathelphusa hainanensis Dai & Xing, 1994
Somanniathelphusa huaanensis Naiyanetr & Dai, 1997
Somanniathelphusa huanglungensis Dai, Peng & Zhou, 1994
Somanniathelphusa kyphuensis Dang, 1975: Vietnam
Somanniathelphusa lacuvita Ng, 1995
Somanniathelphusa linchuanensis Dai, Peng & Zhou, 1994
Somanniathelphusa longicaudus Naiyanetr & Dai, 1997
Somanniathelphusa megachela Naiyanetr & Dai, 1997
Somanniathelphusa nanningensis Naiyanetr & Dai, 1997
Somanniathelphusa pax Ng & Kosuge, 1995: Vietnam
Somanniathelphusa plicatus (Fabricius, 1798): Vietnam
Somanniathelphusa qiongshanensis Dai & Xing, 1994
Somanniathelphusa ruijiensis Dai, Peng & Zhou, 1994
Somanniathelphusa sinensis (H. Milne-Edwards, 1853): China, Vietnam
Somanniathelphusa taiwanensis Bott, 1968
Somanniathelphusa tongzhaensis Naiyanetr & Dai, 1997
Somanniathelphusa triangularis Dang & Hai, 2005: Vietnam
Somanniathelphusa yangshanensis Naiyanetr & Dai, 1997
Somanniathelphusa yuilinensis Naiyanetr & Dai, 1997
Somanniathelphusa zanklon Ng & Dudgeon, 1992
Somanniathelphusa zhangpuensis Naiyanetr & Dai, 1997
Somanniathelphusa zhapoensis Naiyanetr & Dai, 1997
Somanniathelphusa zhongshiensis Dai, Peng & Zhou, 1994

References

Gecarcinucoidea
Freshwater crustaceans of Asia

th:ปูนา